Isotrias martelliana is a species of moth of the family Tortricidae. It is found in Italy (Monti del Pollino, Cozzi dell’Anticristo).

References

Moths described in 1990
Polyorthini
Moths of Europe